Nick Buzz is a Canadian band composed of pianist Jon Goldsmith, violinist Hugh Marsh, guitarist Rob Piltch, and singer/songwriter Martin Tielli.

History
Goldsmith, Marsh, Piltch and Tielli came together in 1992 to collaborate on a cover of Joni Mitchell's "River" for the 1992 Mitchell tribute album Back to the Garden. The four began practising and performing under the name Nick Buzz, a nod to Tielli's chain-smoking habit ('nicotine buzz').

Nick Buzz released a full-length album, Circo, in 1996 through Dark Light Music. It was rereleased in 2002 by Six Shooter Records, with the music magazine Chart calling it a "virtually unheard-of 1996 classic". In 2003, they got back together to perform four songs by Arnold Schoenberg, originally for Andrew Burashko's Art of Time series in Toronto. The group released a recording of these songs for Tielli's Tielli 2003 subscription series on Six Shooter.

In 2013 Nick Buzz released the album A Quiet Evening at Home on Six Shooter Records.

Discography
 Circo (1996)
 Arnold Schoenberg and the Berlin Cabaret (2003)
 A Quiet Evening at Home (2013)

References

External links
 Rusty Spell's USA Nick Buzz Page

1995 establishments in Ontario
Canadian classical music groups
Canadian rock music groups
Musical groups established in 1995
Musical groups from Toronto
Six Shooter Records artists